Flamboyant is a style of Gothic architecture.

Flamboyant may also refer to:
Flamboyant, the common English name of Delonix regia, an ornamental tree

Flamboyant (album), a 2019 album by Dorian Electra and its title track
"Flamboyant" (Big L song), 2000
"Flamboyant" (Pet Shop Boys song), 2004
Flamboyant flower beetle or Eudicella gralli, a type of scarab beetle
Pfeffer's Flamboyant Cuttlefish, a species of cuttlefish
Delonix regia, a species of tree also called a poinciana

See also
 Flame (disambiguation)
 Flaming (disambiguation)